Sheeel.com is a Kuwaiti deal-of-the-day website generally offering one discounted product a day, covering several categories such as, Electronics, Household Goods, and Toys. The origin of the website name comes from the Arabic language, where the word "Sheeel", (Arabic:شيييل) is the affirmative form of the verb "raise" which is usually used for picking up items or buying goods at bazaars.

History
Sheeel.com sold its first deal on January 19, 2011.

Awards
Sheeel.com was awarded first prize in the Kuwait e-Awards under the e-commerce category only three months after launch. The Kuwait e-Awards are sponsored by the Kuwait Foundation for the Advancement of Sciences (KFAS), and are arranged in cooperation with the World Summit Award.

Business
The website sells one discounted deal a day and is known to have cheap and short life spanned items. The selection of products covers various categories including but not limited to Electronics, Toys, Fashion, Fragrances, Home Medical Equipment, and Appliances. From time to time, the website will randomly offers bonus deals when a daily product sell-out early. The website marketing efforts is focused on driving traffic using social media outlets such as Twitter and Facebook. In terms of accessibility, Sheeel.com is viewable as a normal website using desktop browser and as a Web app using smartphones.

Sheeel.com serves the Kuwaiti market only.

References

External links
Sheeel Main Website
Parent Main Website
Coupons & Discounts

2011 establishments in Kuwait
Online retailers of Kuwait
Arabic-language websites
Internet properties established in 2011
Deal of the day services